The River Oughton is a two mile long tributary of the River Hiz in Hitchin, Hertfordshire. It rises at Oughtonhead and flows north-east between Oughtonhead Common and Oughtonhead Nature Reserve. It forms the boundary of Hitchin parish.

The river has clear water from chalk springs in the Chiltern Hills, and it has a rich aquatic and insect life. Plants include spring water crowfoot, and there are mammals such as the water shrew, and birds include kingfishers and water rails.

References

Oughton
Hitchin